Stannole is an organotin compound with the formula (CH)4SnH2. It is classified as a metallole, i.e. an unsaturated five-membered ring containing a heteroatom. It is a structural analog of pyrrole, with tin replacing the nitrogen. Substituted derivatives, which have been synthesized, are also called stannoles.

1λ2-Stannole has formula C4H4Sn, with no hydrogen on the tin atom, which is in the +2 oxidation state.

Examples
1,1-Dibutylstannole is a pale yellow oil prepared from 1,4-dilithio-1,3-butadiene and dibutyltin dichloride.

Reactions
1,1-Dimethyl-2,3,4,5-tetraphenyl-1H-stannole, for example, can be formed by the reaction of 1,4-dilithio-1,2,3,4-tetraphenyl-1,3-butadiene and dimethyltin dichloride. 
1,1-Disubstituted stannoles can be formed in the [2+2+1] cycloaddition reaction of two acetylene molecules with an organotin molecule SnR2.

See also
Organotin chemistry

References

Tin heterocycles
Metalloles
Tin(IV) compounds